Mario de Lorenzo (born July 1912, date of death unknown) was a Brazilian water polo player. He competed in the men's tournament at the 1932 Summer Olympics.

References

1912 births
Year of death missing
Brazilian male water polo players
Olympic water polo players of Brazil
Water polo players at the 1932 Summer Olympics
Water polo players from São Paulo